Cox's Bazar International Airport  is an international airport in the resort town of Cox's Bazar in Bangladesh. The airport services both local residents of Cox's Bazar as well as tourists to the region. In November 2020, Biman Bangladesh Airlines started flights between Sylhet to Cox's Bazar, which was in a first, a direct flight between two cities without any connecting flight from Dhaka. Cox's Bazar International Airport is undergoing massive expansion, which is due to be completed by 2023.

Expansion and development
Since 2012 plans to upgrade and expand the airport to allow international arrivals have been underway. Once completed, it would be the fourth international airport in Bangladesh. The two phases of upgrading, will make the airport able to provide better facilities for parking, landing and take-off for wide-body aircraft such as B777 or A330. The first phase of the upgrade cost  .

Under the first phase in 2012 the airport's runway lengthened from 6,790 feet to 9,000 feet, and widened from 150 feet to 200 feet. The runways load capability was strengthened for wide-body operation, while the runway lighting also received an upgrade. Equipment such as instrument landing system, distance measuring equipment, AMeDAS and VOR was installed. Aircraft Refueling (JET A-1 ) Facilities were available from February 2017 by Standard Asiatic Oil Company Limited, an Enterprise of Bangladesh Petroleum Corporation. Under the second phase the runway will be expanded from 9000 feet to 12000 feet.

Airlines and destinations

Passenger

Cargo

Incidents and accidents
 On 9 March 2016 an Antonov An-26 of True Aviation crashed into the Bay of Bengal shortly after take-off.

See also
 List of airports in Bangladesh

References

External links

 Cox's Bazar Airport
 Civil Aviation Authority of Bangladesh: Airports

Airport
International airports in Bangladesh
World War II sites in India